Biscogniauxia nummularia is a plant pathogen in the family Xylariaceae, known as the beech tarcrust. The specific epithet is derived from the Latin "nummus" meaning a coin, referring to the often rounded and coin-like encrustations.

Description
The fruit body forms a thick and shiny black crust, on beech (Fagus) bark and is found at all times of the year. It is not edible. Young specimens are covered by a light brown outer layer. The spores are black to dark brown.

Distribution
Biscogniauxia nummularia is a common pathogen specific for Beech trees, and has been recorded throughout Europe and Russia.

Environmental impact
The decline of European beech (Fagus sylvatica) in Sicily and Calabria (Italy) has been linked to B. nummularia and experiments have suggested that this ascomycete plays a primary pathogenic role under certain environmental conditions. It typically causes strip‐cankering and general wood decay.

References

Notes

Sources 
 Phillips, Roger (2006). Mushrooms. London : Pan MacMillan. 

Fungi described in 1790
Fungi of Europe
Fungal tree pathogens and diseases
Xylariales
Taxa named by Jean Baptiste François Pierre Bulliard